Hebeler is a surname. Notable people with the surname include:

Henry Felix Clement Hebeler (1917–1989), British veterinary surgeon
Nick Hebeler (born 1957), Canadian football player

Locations
Hebeler, Yığılca, village in Turkey

See also
Hegeler (disambiguation)